The 1948 Macdonald Brier, the Canadian men's national curling championship, was held from March 1 to 4, 1948 at Victoria Arena in Calgary, Alberta.

Team British Columbia, who was skipped by Frenchy D'Amour captured British Columbia's first ever Brier Tankard after finishing round robin play 8-1. D'Amour's rink had finished second the Brier the year before.

Event summary
Both Manitoba and British Columbia got off to hot starts as each of them won their first five games heading into Draw 6, which featured a match  between those teams. Manitoba appeared to be in the drivers seat for their twelfth Brier championship as they scored two in the final end to beat British Columbia 9-8. But in their next two draws, Manitoba lost to both Ontario and Northern Ontario. British Columbia took advantage as they won their next two games over Nova Scotia and New Brunswick, taking the lead with one draw remaining.

Even though British Columbia was leading with a 7-1 record heading into the final draw, both Manitoba and Northern Ontario still had a shot in forcing a playoff as both teams needed to win and if British Columbia lost. Northern Ontario faltered and lose to Nova Scotia 8-6 eliminating them from contention while Manitoba held off a New Brunswick rally with an 11-8 win.

Meanwhile, British Columbia and Quebec were locked in a battle as they were tied at 7 through eight ends. British Columbia appeared to pull away with two in the ninth and a steal of one in the tenth to take a 10-8 lead. After the eleventh end was blanked, Quebec stormed back to score three in the last end to force and extra end. British Columbia scored one in the extra end and won 11-10 to capture the province's first Brier Tankard.

Teams
The teams are listed as follows:

Round-robin standings

Round-robin results

Draw 1

Draw 2

Draw 3

Draw 4

Draw 5

Draw 6

Draw 7

Draw 8

Draw 9

References

External links 
 Video: 

Macdonald Brier, 1948
Macdonald Brier, 1948
The Brier
Curling competitions in Calgary
Macdonald Brier
Macdonald Brier